Christopher Joseph Reccardi (November 24, 1964 – May 2, 2019) was an American animator, cartoon director, writer, storyboard artist, character designer, graphic designer, musician and producer. He worked on numerous animated television series, including The Ren & Stimpy Show, Samurai Jack, The Powerpuff Girls, and Tiny Toon Adventures, and had directing duties on Super Robot Monkey Team Hyperforce Go! and SpongeBob SquarePants. He was also the supervising producer for the first season of Regular Show and creative director for the short-lived Secret Mountain Fort Awesome.

Death
On May 2, 2019, Reccardi died at the age of 54 after suffering a heart attack while surfing in Ventura, California. The 2020 documentary Happy Happy Joy Joy: The Ren and Stimpy Story was dedicated in his memory.

Filmography

Film

Television

Video games

References

External links
 

1964 births
2019 deaths
American writers of Italian descent
Animators from New York (state)
American art directors
American television directors
American television producers
American television writers
American male screenwriters
American storyboard artists
American animated film directors
American animated film producers
Artists from New York City
American male television writers
Spümcø
Screenwriters from California
Screenwriters from New York (state)
DreamWorks Animation people
Nickelodeon Animation Studio people
Cartoon Network Studios people
American people of Italian descent